Nazmi Gripshi (born 5 July 1997) is an Albanian professional footballer who plays as an attacking midfielder for Kosovar club Ballkani in the Kosovo Superleague.

Club career

Teuta Durrës
Gripshi came up through the Teuta Durrës youth academy and made his senior league debut for the club on 9 May 2015 in a 3–2 away loss to Kukësi. He was subbed on in the 78th minute for Resul Kastrati. He scored his first senior goal on 19 September 2015 in the 3–1 league win over bottom side Tërbuni Pukë, netting the third in injury time with a counter-attack.

Skënderbeu Korçë
On 29 January 2017, Gripshi completed a move to fellow Albanian Superliga side Skënderbeu Korçë for a fee of €60,000. He was presented two days later where he penned a four-year contract. He made his league debut for the club on 6 February 2017 in a 1–0 away win over Korabi Peshkopi, entering in the final minutes in place of Cornel Predescu. He opened his scoring account on the final game versus Partizani Tirana which finished in a 2–2 draw at home.

In the 2017–18 season, Gripshi made 15 appearances between league and cup with Skënderbeu Korçë completing the domestic double for the first time in history.

In July 2018, ahead of the 2018–19 season, Gripshi changed his squad number from 97 to 10, which was vacated for two years following the retirement of club legend Bledi Shkëmbi.

On 24 August 2019, in Skënderbeu's opening match of the 2019–20 season against Flamurtari Vlorë, Gripshi scored the only goal of the match in the 95th minute in a 1–0 home win in Albanian Superliga.

International career
During a gathering of the Albania national under-21 football team for a double Friendly match against Moldova U21 on 25 & 27 March 2017, Keidi Bare left the under-21 side to join Albania senior team and following that, coach Alban Bushi called up Gripshi as a replacement to participate in the second match against Moldova U21 on 27 March 2017. Gripshi played in the match as a second-half substitute.

He received his first call up for the Albania under-20 side by coach Alban Bushi for the double friendly match against Azerbaijan U-21 on 21 & 26 January 2018.

Career statistics

Club

Honours
Skënderbeu Korçë
 Albanian Superliga: 2017–18
 Albanian Cup: 2017–18

References

External links
FSHF profile

Nazmi Gripshi - Instagram

1997 births
Living people
Footballers from Durrës
Albanian footballers
Association football midfielders
Albania youth international footballers
Albania under-21 international footballers
KF Teuta Durrës players
KF Skënderbeu Korçë players
Kategoria e Dytë players
Kategoria Superiore players